Gevorg Karlenovich Arutyunyan (born 21 February 1997) is a Russian football player.

Club career
He made his professional debut in the Russian Professional Football League for FC Rubin-2 Kazan on 18 July 2014 in a game against FC Syzran-2003 Syzran.

He played his first game for the main squad of FC Rubin Kazan on 24 September 2015 in a Russian Cup game against FC SKA-Energiya Khabarovsk which his team lost 0-2.

International
He is of Armenian descent and is eligible for both Russia and Armenia. After representing Russia national under-18 football team, he was called up to the Armenia national under-21 football team, but did not play any games for the squad.

References

1997 births
People from Dimitrovgrad, Russia
Living people
Russian footballers
Association football forwards
Russian people of Armenian descent
FC Rubin Kazan players
FC Pyunik players
Russian expatriate footballers
Expatriate footballers in Armenia
Russia youth international footballers
Sportspeople from Ulyanovsk Oblast